Hadrosteus is an extinct monospecific genus of large arthrodire placoderm from the Late Frasnian (Late Devonian) Kellwasserkalk facies of Bad Wildungen, Germany.<ref name=Denison>{{cite book|last=Denison|first=Robert|title=Placodermi Volume 2 of Handbook of Paleoichthyology|year=1978|publisher=Gustav Fischer Verlag|location=Stuttgart New York|isbn=978-0-89574-027-4|pages=89–90}}</ref> It had large, double-pronged inferognathals (lower jawbones), and serrated edges along its mandible, strongly suggesting that it was a fish-eating predator. The head had a triangular snout, and the trunkshield was short, but high, with a median dorsal plate that was broader than wide. The average skull length is about 16 centimeters.

Etymology
The type species Hadrosteus rapax''' means "Rapacious Strong-Bone".

PhylogenyHadrosteus is a member of the clade Aspinothoracidi, which belongs to the clade Pachyosteomorphi, one of the two major clades within Eubrachythoraci. The cladogram below shows the phylogeny of Hadrosteus'':

References

Arthrodires
Arthrodire genera
Placoderms of Europe